Råbygda (or historically: Gjølme) is a village in the municipality of Orkland in Trøndelag county, Norway. The village is located on the western shore of the Orkla River, at the mouth of the river. There is a silicon carbide factory in the village.

Since 2012, the village has been part of the Orkanger-Fannrem urban area. The name was changed to Råbygda in 2013. Prior to that time, it was called Gjølme.

References

Orkland
Villages in Trøndelag